Lisa Kearney (born 27 May 1989) is a Northern Irish retired judoka, who competed in the −48 kg category. Kearney, who lives and trains in Belfast, competed in the 2012 Summer Olympics in London as a member of the Ireland Olympic team.

Career 
Kearney started judo at primary school in order to join her friends. Whilst still a child in 1999, she won silver in the −27 kg category of the Northern Ireland Judo Championships. In 2009, she became the first judoka representing Ireland to reach the final of a Judo World Cup. In 2012, she recovered from injury earned qualification for the Women's −48 kg judo at the 2012 Olympic Games in London by finishing in the top 14 in the International Judo Federation rankings. In doing so, she became the first female judoka representing Ireland to compete at the Olympics. However, she lost her opening match to Wu Shegun of China. The national Irish public broadcaster Raidió Teilifís Éireann was criticised for not featuring her match in their television coverage. During 2013, she missed several events due to injury but got back into competing in preparation for the Commonwealth Games. In 2014, Kearney represented Northern Ireland at the 2014 Commonwealth Games in the Women's −52 kg category and won the bronze medal with an armbar submission of Canada's Audrée Francis-Méthot, which was also Northern Ireland's first medal of the games.

She had aimed to compete at the 2016 Summer Olympics but suffered a knee injury which ruled her out of the Olympics as she was unable to take part in the qualification tournaments. She stepped out under the advice of the Sports Institute for Northern Ireland who oversaw her rehabilitation. In 2017, she announced her retirement from competitive judo. Kearney had won four World Cup gold medals.

Personal life 
Kearney was born on 27 May 1989 in Belfast, Northern Ireland. She studied psychology as a student at Heriot-Watt University in Edinburgh, Scotland.

References

External links
 
 
 

1989 births
Living people
Female judoka from Northern Ireland
Judoka at the 2012 Summer Olympics
Olympic judoka of Ireland
Sportspeople from Belfast
Alumni of Heriot-Watt University
Commonwealth Games bronze medallists for Northern Ireland
Commonwealth Games medallists in judo
Judoka at the 2014 Commonwealth Games
Medallists at the 2014 Commonwealth Games